The Spaulding Manufacturing Company is a complex of historic buildings located in Grinnell, Iowa, United States. Vermont native H.W. Spaulding settled in Grinnell in 1876 to open a blacksmith and wagon repair shop. Not long after, he started to manufacture wagons. Because of his modest success he entered into a series of partnerships over the years. The oldest building in the complex was completed around 1880, and the company grew to a complex of five buildings. All the buildings are brick construction, and they range in height from two floors to three floors. As modes of transportation began to change, so did Spaulding. The company began manufacturing automobiles. They were one of several early automobile manufacturers that had existing operations that manufactured bicycles, wagons, and carriages. They went out of business in 1929. Since that time the facility has housed a variety of small-scale manufactures, and even a veterinary clinic. Part of the plant was renovated and now houses the administration offices for the City of Grinnell and displays for the Iowa Transportation Museum, which is now closed due to a variety of financial issues. The largest buildings of the manufacturing complex were renovated and converted into the Spaulding Lofts apartments. The complex was listed on the National Register of Historic Places in 1978.

References

Grinnell, Iowa
Buildings and structures in Poweshiek County, Iowa
National Register of Historic Places in Poweshiek County, Iowa
Industrial buildings and structures on the National Register of Historic Places in Iowa
Car manufacturers of the United States
Motor vehicle manufacturing plants on the National Register of Historic Places
Transportation buildings and structures on the National Register of Historic Places in Iowa